Paul J. Cloke,  was an author and professor of geography. He was known as the founding editor of the international and multidisciplinary academic Journal of Rural Studies, published by Elsevier Science. , he was a faculty member of the Department of Geography at the University of Exeter.

Educational background 
Cloke attended the University of Southampton, graduating with a Bachelor's degree in geography. He studied for his PhD at Wye College (University of London). His academic area of expertise focused on human geography.

Professional background 
Following his graduation from Wye College, Cloke joined the staff of St David's University College, Lampeter (University of Wales). While at Lampeter, he was part of the Lampeter Geography School. He has also served as a professor of geography at the University of Bristol. At the time of his death he was a staff member with the University of Exeter and adjunct professor at the University of Canterbury, New Zealand.

Theology 
Cloke was an Evangelical Christian and co-authored a trilogy of works entitled Mission in Marginal Places with theologian Mike Pears.

Death 
Cloke died on 25 May 2022.

Honors and awards 
 2022: Victoria Medal, Royal Geographical Society
 Doctor of Science, University of Bristol,  
 2002: Academician of the Academy of Learned Societies for the Social Sciences 
 2005: Honorary Fellow of the Royal Society of New Zealand
 2009: Fellow of the British Academy

Published works 
 Cloke, Paul J. An Introduction to Rural Settlement Planning, Taylor & Francis, Inc., 1983. 
 Cloke, Paul J. Rural Resource Management, St. Martin's Press, 1985. 
 Cloke, Paul J. The Rural State?: Limits to Planning in Rural Society, Oxford University Press, 1990. 
 Cloke, Paul J. Policies and Plans for Rural People: An International Perspective, Taylor & Francis, Inc., 1990. 
 Cloke, Paul J. Approaching Human Geography, Guilford Publications, Inc., 1991. 
 Cloke, Paul J. Policy and Change in Thatcher's Britain: Policy and Planning and Critical Theory, Elsevier Science & Technology Books, 1992. 
 Cloke, Paul J. Rural Land-Use Planning in Developed Nations, Cengage Learning, 1992. 
 Cloke, Paul J. Writing The Rural, SAGE Publications, 1994. 
 Cloke, Paul J. Introducing Human Geographies, London: Hodder Education Publishers (subsidiary of Hachette Publishing, 1999. 
 Cloke, Paul J. Rural Homelessness: Issues, Experiences and Policy Responses, Policy Press, 2002. 
 Cloke, Paul J. Practising Human Geography, SAGE Publications, 2004. 
 Cloke, Paul J. Spaces of Geographical Thought: Deconstructing Human Geography's Binaries, SAGE Publications, 2005. 
 Cloke, Paul J. The Handbook of Rural Studies, SAGE Publications, 2006. 
 Cloke, Paul J. Swept-Up Lives?: Re-envisioning the Homeless City, Wiley-Blackwell, 2010. 
 Cloke, Paul J. Globalizing Responsibility: The Political Rationalities of Ethical Consumption, Wiley-Blackwell, 2010.

References 

20th-century births
2022 deaths
New Zealand geographers
Fellows of the British Academy
Fellows of the Royal Society of New Zealand
Alumni of the University of Southampton
Alumni of Wye College
Alumni of the University of Bristol
Academics of the University of Exeter
Fellows of the Academy of Social Sciences